Seb is a masculine given name, often a shortened form (hypocorism) of Sebastian. It may refer to:

People:
 Sebastian Vettel (born 1987), German racing driver, four-time Formula One world champion
 Seb Brown (born 1989), English football goalkeeper
 Sebastian Coe (born 1956), British politician and former middle-distance runner
 Seb Dance (born 1981), British politician
 Seb Feszczur-Hatchett (born 1995), English cricketer
 Seb Gotch (born 1993), Australian cricketer
 Seb Hines (born 1988), English footballer
 Seb Jewell (born 1987), English rugby union player
 Sebastian Larsson (born 1985), Swedish footballer
 Seb Rochford, Scottish drummer and bandleader
 Sebastian Rodger (born 1991), British hurdler and former decathlete
 Seb Sanders (born 1971), English flat race jockey
 Seb Stegmann (born 1989), English rugby union player
 Seb Stewart-Taylor (born 1995), English cricketer
 Seb Tape (born 1992), former Australian rules footballer

Fictional characters:
 Seb Crossley, in the British television series The Evermoor Chronicles
 Seb Miller, in the Australian soap opera Home and Away

See also 
 Geb, whose name was originally read as Seb

Masculine given names
Hypocorisms